Anisa Abdulkadir Hajimumin (born November 20, 1978) is a Somali American politician, social activist and writer. She is the Minister of Women & Family Affairs of Puntland.

Background
Hajimumin was born in the Puntland region, situated in northeastern Somalia. She later moved to Minneapolis, where she earned a BA in Women Studies from Metropolitan State University. She also graduated in Public Administration specializing on public policy analysis and human resource development at Hamline University. Additionally, Hajimumin previously worked as an immigration paralegal Southern Minnesota Regional Legal Services.

In 2013, she founded Hajimumin & Associates, an NGO focused on designing workshops for youth development and women's empowerment.

Minister of Women & Family Affairs
On 13 February 2014, Hajimumin officially took office in Puntland's state capital, Garowe. Former Minister Halimo Haji Hassan handed over to the new minister documents containing the recent developments achieved by the previous team of the ministry and pending plans. Hajimumin thanked the previous minister and vowed to protect and strengthen women's rights.

References

External links
LinkedIn page

Living people
Ethnic Somali people
American people of Somali descent
Somalian Muslims
Somalian politicians
Puntland politicians
Metropolitan State University alumni
Hamline University alumni
1978 births